Highway 42 is a north-south highway in central Israel. It leads from just south of Ashdod Interchange in the south to Gan Rave interchange in the north.

Junctions and interchanges on the highway

See also
 List of highways in Israel

42